Alkonost is a Russian epic folk metal band formed in Naberezhnye Chelny, Tatarstan, Russia in 1995.

Popularity
The band is best known amongst heavy metal fans in their native country of the Russian Federation. However, their music has been discussed and shared on the internet, particularly on Usenet, and they have found new audiences in the Nordic countries and United Kingdom. Signed to Metalism Records, their albums are available with English titles, although the songs themselves are predominantly sung in Russian. In 2007, for the first time, the band was able to perform outside of Russia, touring Ukraine, Belarus, Slovakia and the Czech Republic, where they were warmly received.

Influences
The band's material is based on Russian paganism and mythology, and the melodies are drawn from indigenous Russian folk music, but the arrangements and riffs are drawn from power metal, black metal and symphonic metal, consisting of simplistic power chords under intricate "shredding" lead guitar (characteristic of power metal), male low-end shrieks (found in black metal) and soaring female operatic vocals (as found in symphonic metal). This has led them to be categorised in all these genres, as well as doom metal and folk metal.

History

1996–1999 
The band Alkonost was formed in August 1996 by Andrey Losev (Elk), a bass guitarist who previously played in such groups as Mourning Beads, Molestation and Canonis. According to Losev's idea, the music of the band should be following medieval European musical traditions, yet combining it with Russian folk melodies. Losev developed these ideas and at the same time was looking for musicians even before the formation of the band. Thus, the first members of the band were: Andrey Losev (guitar), Alexey Solovyov (bass guitar) and Sergey Medvedev (guitar). But Sergey left the band in 1997, leaving them a song «Shadows of Dark Days», which was included in their first demo-album. The same year three-song demo-album «Shadows of Glory» was released. Raja from Cerberus band, who also sang on the band's early recordings, featured as vocalist during the life performances, and the drum-machine was used instead of a drummer. Members of the band were not satisfied with this situation so they decided to stop live performances and to concentrate on recording their debut album.
The album was recorded within 2 years. An attempts to find a vocalist were unsuccessful and so Alexey Solovyov began to sing. Also during that period a drummer Vladimir Lushin joined the band. Thus, the members of the band were the following: Andrey Losev - guitar, Alexey Solovyov - bass and vocals, Vladimir Lushin - drums. With this line-up the band shared stage at the “End of the World-2” festival on December 12, 1998, with such bands as Miscreant, Molestation and Pannychida. From that moment, Alkonost began to play shows regularly. So, in 1999, the band played at “the End of the World 3” and “Death Panorama 7” festivals. In February 1999, Almira Fatkhullina became their keyboard player.

2000–2004 
On January 26, 2000, the band presented their debut full-length album, “Songs of the Eternal Oak”, which was released on audio cassettes in May by the Latvian label Beverina Productions and the German Ketzer Records. After that Alkonost played some shows, including “Death Panorama 9” and a festival in Ulyanovsk. However, due to numerous technical problems, the band had to stop playing live since October 2000. But they continued to create music and got down to recording of demo-album “Spirit Tending to Revolt”, the work on which was delayed by the studio for almost a year. Soon the drummer Vladimir Lushin left  the band, replaced by Anton Chepigin, who previously played in Cerberus and Flaming Hate. At the same time the vocal part of their music changed dramatically - the singer Alyona Pelevina joined the band and she began to sing with a clean female vocals instead of a male growling. The language of the lyrics has also changed by switching from English to Russian. Since April 2001, Alkonost began to perform live again, playing in Naberezhnye Chelny, Mendeleevsk, Kazan, as well as at the “Iron March 2” festival in the city of Ufa. By August of that year, the recording of a demo “Spirit Tending to Revolt” had been finished, and by November the completely Russian-language material was also recorded as a demo “Nevedomye Zemli” (Unknown Lands).
On July 31, 2002, through the efforts of Beverina Productions and Ketzer Records, the Alkonost CD was released, consisting of an album “Songs of the Eternal Oak”, a demo “Spirit Tending to Revolt”, as well as two video clips. This release was a commercial success getting 7.5 points out of 10 in the German magazine “Rock Hard”. The year 2003 was marked by the beginning of recording of a new album and performances at such festivals as Rock Line and Chronos Fest. Also in September of the same year guitarist Dmitry Sokolov joined the band and the Alkonost album was reissued in Russia by Soyuz Music. In 2004, Alkonost became winners of the first rock award of Naberezhnye Chelny “Zhivoye Peklo” (Living Hell) in the nominations "Best Rock Group" and "Rock Breakthrough".  On May 22, the band participated in Folk-Metal Fest and on May 31 in Iron march. A next step for the band was signing a contract with Soyuz Records company. In November 2004, the band's new label released an album “Between the Worlds” with 7 songs in English and 1 in Russian.

2005–2007 
In 2005, the band toured a lot, giving live shows in Ufa, Kazan, Izhevsk, Yoshkar-Ola, Nizhny Novgorod, etc. In the same year, the “Zhivoye Peklo” award was won for the second time in the nomination “Best Rock Group of the Year”. However, at the same time, Alkonost was overtaken by problems - the planned album “Mezhmirie” (Russian version of “Between the Worlds”) did not come out, and the band's manager D. V. Tyunev had resigned. After these events, the band began to record the upcoming album “Pout' Neproydenny” (The Path We've Never Made) (CDM-Records studio). Thus, in 2006, their new label, Metalism Records, issued both albums, the old “Between the Worlds” and the new “The Path We've Never Made”. After this a tour around the cities of Russia was organized to support this new release. It was a great success, the album received a lot of positive feedback, and got to the top of a reader's selection chart of Dark City magazine.

After finishing the tour, the band prepared to record new songs almost immediately, simultaneously re-recording their debut album “Songs of the Eternal Oak” with Russian lyrics. In 2006, Alkonost celebrated their 10th anniversary by performing in one of the best concert halls in the city, which was attended by about 1,000 people. After that the band went to Moscow to finish the work on a “Pesni Vechnogo Dreva”  (Songs of the Eternal Oak) album at the Moscow Sound Records studio. The vocalists of Svarga and Rarog bands took part in that recording as guest musicians. The album was released by the Metalism Records. Then the band went on a big tour during which they also played many shows in Ukraine. After finishing the tour, the musicians went  back to the studio to record a new album called “Kamennogo Serdtsa Krov'” (Stone Heart Blood). The album included old songs composed back in 1995–1997, as well as the ones that were not included in the “Pout' Neproydenny” (The Path We've Never Made). In addition, 8 vocalists took part in the recording.

In 2007, Alkonost played the shows together with Master, as well as with Znich at the folk metal music festival in Minsk. In autumn, the band went on a joint European tour with Arkona, and at the end of the year gave few more shows in Russia.

2008–2009 
In 2008, the band went on tour in Russia and in April 2009 - in Europe (Poland, Slovenia, Holland, Germany, Slovakia, Czech Republic), where it performed at Ragnarok fest, held in Germany from April 17 to 18. At that festival Alkonost shared the stage with Einherjer, Korpiklaani, Týr, Thyrfing, Månegarm, Melechesh and others.

During 2009, Alkonost was engaged in recording their next album, occasionally giving some shows in Russia.

2010–2013 
In 2010, the long-awaited new album “Na Kryliakh Zova” (On the Wings of the Call) was released by the German label “Einheit Produktionen”. Alexey Solovyov left the band. Alkonost focused on recording the next studio album, occasionally giving single performances in Russia and Ukraine.

In 2011–2012, Almira Fatkhullina, Alyona Pelevina, Anton Chepigin and session bassist/vocalist Vladimir Pavlik left the band.

In 2012, Ksenia Pobuzhanskaya (vocals) and Maxim Shtanke (vocals/bass guitar) joined the band, and with this updated line-up Alkonost returned to active touring.

In 2012, the band continued touring and participated in such large-scale events as: Moto-Maloyaroslavets, Invasion, Fire Fest festivals and Carpathian Alliance Metal Festival (UA). Then Alkonost went on a short tour around the cities of Ukraine.

2013–2015 
2013 was marked by the release of a new album “Skazki Stranstviy” (Tales of Wanderings) and a big tour to support it. In 1,5 months Alkonost visited more than 30 cities of Russia! Three years in a row, the band played at the very beloved by the people, great event called Folk Summer Fest. In 2014 the headliners of the said festival were such bands as Korpiklaani, Melnitsa, Arkona, Tanzwut, Fintroll, etc. While actively touring around the cities of Russia, in June 2014 Alkonost released a single called “Rusalka” (Mermaid), which was very warm received by the fans.

In 2015, Maxim Shtanke and Dmitry Sokolov left the band. They were temporarily replaced by Vitold "Vitold" Buznayev (bass guitar, vocals) and Danila Pereladov (guitar). Alkonost continued touring a lot, also participating in the worldwide tribute album to Paradise Lost and in Russian tribute album to Butterfly Temple. The English version of the album “Skazki Stranstviy” (Tales of Wanderings) was released in the fall of 2015 on 2 labels: Latvian Beverina (vinyl) and Russian Sound Age (CD). In December 2015, the band released a video for the acoustic version of the song “Rusalka” (Mermaid).

2016–present 
In the early summer of 2016, Latvian label Beverina reissued Alkonost's album “Kamennogo Serdtsa Krov'” (Stone Heart Blood) on a vinyl. In May 2016 a collector's edition of a mini-vinyl with the song “Rusalka” (Mermaid) limited to 21 copies was released on the same label.

In 2016, Rustem Shagitov joined the band as a bass guitarist and Pavel Kosolapov took the place of guitarist-vocalist. The band continued to play live actively, performing at such events as Folk Winter Fest, Zhivoe Peklo, Folk Summer Fest 2016 as well as many other festivals. In the fall of 2016, the band went on tour to European countries presenting their 7-th full-length album “Pesni Beloy Lilii” (Songs of the White Lily), which was released on October 5, 2016. For now the band continues to present this album in Russia.

On March 3, 2017, there was the anniversary show of Alkonost band. The band celebrated their 20th anniversary with 2 performances of a different line-ups: the current and the classical one.

On March 17, 2017, Alkonost had signed a three-year contract with Sleasly Rider Records label to release the album “Pesni Beloy Lilii” (Songs of the White Lily) on a CD for distribution in Europe. On March 29, the label Black Death Production released a cassette edition of the 7-th album of the band, called “Pesni Beloy Lilii” (Songs of the White Lily). On September 5, 2017, Internet edition of the single “Tropa k Vesne” (Path to the Spring) was released.

On April 1, 2018, Internet edition of the single “Listopad” (Leaf Fall) was released. After that, the band went on a European tour. They have visited the following countries: Poland, Czech Republic, Slovakia, Hungary, Romania, Serbia.

On August 30, 2018, on the day of the band's anniversary, Internet edition of the single “Vrata Zimi” (Gates of Winter) was released.

On October 8, 2018, the single “Paporotnik” (Fern) was released just prior to the release of their next full-length album.

On October 21, 2018, the 8th album "Octagram" was released.

July 1, 2019. The single "Lenta na Vetru" (Ribbon in the Wind) was released. It included a new version of the song "Cold Fire of the Night" called "Cold Fire of the Night 2019".
October 15, 2019. The single "Sail" was released. It included the song of the same name and the rethought song "Vihr’ Vremeni" (the original "Vortex of Times" from the 2004 Alkonost album).

End of February 2020 - March 2020. Alkonost did a Ural-Siberian tour from Ufa to Krasnoyarsk with session musicians: Ravil Nizametdinov - drums (Psychosis, Impact), Pavel Kosolapov - guitar.

May 1, 2020. A new single "Tam, gde zhivut vetra" (Where the Winds Live) was released. Mixing and mastering - Vitold "Vitold" Buznaev (Grai, Impact).

On July 31, 2020, the first single from the experimental album "Alkonost - Piano version" called "The River" was released.

On August 30, 2020, another single "The Prophecy" from the upcoming full-length album titled "Vedomye Vetrom" (Driven By the Wind) was released. This single also includes a cover version of the Voronia's song "Witch" (written by Rimma Bahteeva, ex-Grai).

On October 30, 2020, the second single from the "Alkonost - Piano version" album, the "Night Time" was released.

On November 13, 2020, the album "Alkonost - Piano version" was released. It contains some of the band's songs done in a New Age style.

On December 11, 2020, the song "Bird" featuring guest vocals from Petri Lindoors (Ensiferum) was released.

On January 21, 2021, the ninth full-length album "Vedomye Vetrom" (Driven by the Wind) is released.

Members

Current members
 Andrey Losev – guitar (1996–present)
 Ksenia Pobuzhanskaya – vocals (2012–2014, 2015–present)
 Rustem Shagitov – bass (2016–2018), guitar (2018–present)

Live musicians
 Alexey Mitrofanov – bass (2018–present)
 Ravil Nizametdinov – drums (2020–present)
 Pavel Kosolapov – guitar (2020–present)

Former members
 Alexey Solovyov – bass, vocals (1996–2010)
 Sergey "Kooker" Medvedev – guitar (1997)
 Vladimir "VL" Lushin – drums (1998–2000; died 2019)
 Almira Fatkhullina – keyboards (1999–2011)
 Anton Chepigin – drums (2000–2011)
 Alyona Pelevina – vocals (2002–2011)
 Dmitry Sokolov – guitar (2003–2015)
 Maxim Shtanke – bass, vocals (2012–2015)
 Anastasia Ryabova – drums (2014–2015)
 Pavel Kosolapov – guitar, vocals (2015–2017)

Former live members
 Vladimir Pavlik – vocals, bass (2010–2011)
 Irina Zybina – vocals (2009–2010)
 Vitold Buznaev – bass (2015–2016)
 Danila "Skorb" Pereladov – guitar (2015–2016)
 Dmitry Dzhus – drums (2016)
 Dmitriy "Fin" Fiskin – drums (2016, 2017)
 Andrey Ischenko – drums (2017)
 Mark Kirichenko – drums (2018–2019)

Timeline

Discography

Studio albums

Compilations

Demos

DVDs

References

External links
Official band website

Musical groups established in 1995
Russian heavy metal musical groups
Russian folk metal musical groups